HŠK Zrinjski Mostar is a professional football club, based in Mostar, Bosnia and Herzegovina. The club plays in the Premier League of Bosnia and Herzegovina, and has been one of the top teams in the country over the last few years. With seven championships won in  the Premier League of Bosnia and Herzegovina, Zrinjski is one of the most decorated football clubs in Bosnia and Herzegovina. The club plays its home matches at Stadion pod Bijelim Brijegom in Mostar. Zrinjski's fans are called Ultras Mostar and the fan club was founded in 1994.

Zrinjski Mostar was founded by Croatian youth in 1905 and is the oldest football club in Bosnia and Herzegovina. After World War II, all clubs that had participated in the wartime Croatian league were banned in Yugoslavia, Zrinjski being one of them. The ban lasted from 1945 to 1992. The club was reformed after the independence of Bosnia and Herzegovina. It played in the First League of Herzeg-Bosnia until 2000 when it joined the Premier League. In 2005, Zrinjski celebrated its first championship crown in the Premier League of Bosnia and Herzegovina.

Today the football team is part of the Zrinjski Mostar sport society.

History

The beginning and early years

In 1896, several distinguished Herzegovinians from Mostar had an idea to form a youth sports society named Hrvatski sokol (Croatian Falcon). At the time, this was not allowed, but in 1905, Croat youth led by Professor Kuštreb succeeded. With the help of the cultural society Hrvoje they formed Đački športski klub (Student Sports Club). In 1912, it evolved into Gimnazijski nogometni klub Zrinjski (Gymnasium Football Club Zrinjski). It was named after the historic Croatian noble family Zrinski. Some of the first games they played were against the sports team Osman from Sarajevo: the games ended 0–3 and 2–1. Club activist and player Ivo Ćorić wrote first reports about the club at that time. He named some of the players: Rudolf Brozović, Bruno and Edo Novak, Marko Suton, Željko and Ante Merdžo, Abid Pehlivanović, Slavko Jukić, Ivan Bošnjak and Karlo Šmit. In 1914, at the outset of World War I, the club was banned. This ban lasted until 1917 when Zrinjski, along with another Croatian sports club from Mostar, Hrvatski radnički omladinski športski klub (HROŠK), formed a new club called “Hercegovac”. Some of the HROŠK players were: Jure Zelenika, Nikola Paladžić, Miroslav Prpić, Mirko Vlaho, Ante Pavković and Kažimir Zubac.

In 1922, the original name Zrinjski was brought back and at that time, the team started to compete more seriously. They played against other Mostar teams, like Yugoslavian Sports Club (JŠK), Velež and Vardar, and also teams from all over Herzegovina, Bosnia and Dalmatia. In 1923, Zrinjski won the Mostar Championship with a 1–0 victory over JŠK. The players that played in that game were: Vjekoslav Vrančić, Kazimir Vlaho, Živo Bebek, Rudi Janjušić, Husein H. Omerović, Milivoj Smoljan, Pero Golić, Mijo Miličević, Muhamed Omeragić, August Kučinović and Franjo Štimac. In the 1930s Zrinjski played games in Zagreb, Sarajevo, Banja Luka and even Montenegro. In 1936, Yugoslav authorities did not allow Zrinjski to play at a tournament in Dubrovnik because they had Croatian colors on their jersey. In 1938, Zrinjski won a tournament against Velež, ŠK Sloga and ŠK Makabi. At that time they also played three night games, with the lights they borrowed from the local mine. Some of the club presidents from 1905 to 1945 were Miško Mikulić, Drago Turkelj, Jakša Miljković and Blaž Slišković.

World War II and ban
In 1941, following the Nazi invasion of Yugoslavia, a fascist puppet state was proclaimed under the name Independent State of Croatia. A football league was also formed, and Zrinjski joined it when it was admitted to FIFA. In the league Zrinjski played some historic games against Građanski Zagreb.

In 1943, Zrinjski played against Jedinstvo, winning that match 2–1, which was probably the last before the club was banned. By the end of the Second World War, the Independent State of Croatia had been defeated by the Yugoslav Partisans resistance movement. Zrinjski was among the clubs banned in 1945 for being nationalist propaganda tools.

Restoration
After Bosnia and Herzegovina became an independent state in 1992, Zrinjski was reestablished in Međugorje. Because of the ongoing war, for the first two years Zrinjski played only friendly games, mostly in Herzegovina and Croatia, but also in Canada and Germany. In 1994, Zrinjski, along with other Croat clubs from Bosnia and Herzegovina helped create the Herzeg-Bosnia Football Federation. The club participated in its league for seven seasons, and was one best teams over the years. Some of the notable players at that time were Blaž Slišković and Slaven Musa, both FK Velež Mostar players before that. In 1998, Zrinjski participated in the first playoffs with teams from Bosniak-ruled parts of Bosnia and Herzegovina. In 2000, the Premier League included both clubs from Bosniak-ruled and Croat-ruled parts of the country for the first time, and Zrinjski was one of the clubs competing in the league and still is today. Clubs from Serb-ruled parts of Bosnia and Herzegovina 
joined in 2002.

In the summer of 2000, Zrinjski also participated in a UEFA competition for the first time. They played in the Intertoto Cup against Swedish team Västra Frölunda IF. Zrinjski lost the first game in Sweden 1–0 and in Mostar led 1–0 after 90 minutes. At the beginning of overtime, Zrinjski scored another goal and had the result that would send them to the next round, but the game ultimately ended with 3–2 Zrinjski victory and Vastra Frolunda went through because of away goals.

The new era

Before the 2003–04 season, some new board members entered the club, bringing better sponsors. Their primary goal was to make Zrinjski one of the top clubs in the country by its 100th anniversary in 2005. Zrinjski then took four players on loan from Dinamo Zagreb: Luka Modrić, Marko Janjetović, Ivica Džidić and Davor Landeka. After the season Džidić and Landeka stayed permanently. Although Zrinjski was nowhere near the top, the base for the next season was created. In summer of 2004, the club signed some of the best players in the league, such as Zoran Rajović, Dušan Kerkez, Velimir Vidić, and Sulejman Smajić. The team, led by manager Franjo Džidić, won the title easily, with a significant point advantage over runner up Željezničar. Zoran Rajović was the league's leading scorer.

Many of Zrinjski's star players were on one year contracts and left the team after the season. As a result, the team did not play well at the beginning of the season and was surprisingly knocked out of the UEFA Champions League first qualifying round by Luxembourg team F91 Dudelange. Zrinjski won the first game away 1–0, but lost at home after overtime 4–0. Not long after the beginning of the season, Blaž Slišković was appointed as manager.

Zrinjski finished the 2005–06 season in third place, earning a place in the Intertoto Cup, where Zrinjski knocked out Maltese team Marsaxlokk (3–0 home, 1–1 away) in the first round and lost to Israel team Maccabi Petah Tikva (1–1 away, 1–3 home) in the second round.

In the 2006–07 season, Zrinjski finished in second place, earning a UEFA Europa League berth. During the winter break, Zrinjski lost one of its best players Lamine Diarra, who transferred to Beira-Mar, but it signed former star player Zoran Rajović on a free transfer. Zrinjski also signed another former player, an experienced midfielder Mario Ivanković from Brotnjo.

In 2007–08, Zrinjski lost in the first qualifying round to FK Partizan of Serbia, 11–1 on aggregate. However, Partizan was expelled from the competition due to crowd trouble, so Zrinjski progressed to the second round where they lost 2–1 on aggregate to FK Rabotnički of Macedonia. The domestic campaign saw them finish fourth, but a victory in the Cup of Bosnia and Herzegovina earned them a place in the UEFA Cup once again.

In the 2008–09 season, Zrinjski managed a 5–1 aggregate with over FC Vaduz in the first qualifying round of the UEFA Cup, but lost 3–0 to SC Braga the next round. They also won the Premier League for the second time, led by talismanic striker Krešimir Kordić, who top scored with 13 league goals.

The league title meant that Zrinjski went into the second round of qualifying for the UEFA Champions League, just their second time in the competition. Unfortunately, the side lost 1–4 on aggregate to ŠK Slovan Bratislava despite a 1–0 home leg win. A disappointing 2009–10 season in the league left Zrinjski in fourth place.

Zrinjski's participation in European football lasted longer in the 2010–11 season than in others, with the side beating both FC Tobol and Tre Penne before losing to Odense Boldklub in the third qualifying round of the UEFA Europa League. Zrinjski fell further down the league table and once again managed just a seventh-place finish, meaning the side would not play European football next season. In the 2011–12 season, Zrinjski improved only slightly: a sixth-place finish again meant that the side would not participate in continental football the following season. The 2012–13 season was the worst in almost ten years with the club slumping to a ninth-place finished, but managed to qualify for European football through a strong cup performance, where they reached the semi-final.

The 2013–14 season was one that will long stay in the memories and hearts of Zrinjski supporters. After a season long three-way battle for the title between themselves, NK Široki Brijeg and FK Sarajevo, Zrinjski came out victorious to win their third ever Premier League title, their first since 2004–05. The title win in the previous season once again sent Zrinjski to the UEFA Champions League second qualifying stage where they drew NK Maribor.

During the period from 2015 until 2018, Zrinjski dominated the Premier League, winning three league titles in a row, two of them won by manager Blaž Slišković and one by Vinko Marinović. The club also got better in European competitions, participating in the third qualifying rounds of the UEFA Europa League in the 2018–19, 2019–20 and 2020–21 seasons. In 2018, Zrinjski got eliminated in the third round by Bulgarian club Ludogorets Razgrad, in 2019 by Swedish club Malmö and in 2020 nearly by Cypriot club APOEL. Interestingly enough, in the first two European "campaigns", the club was led by Croatian managers Ante Miše and Hari Vukas respectively. In the third one, Zrinjski was managed by Bosnian manager Mladen Žižović.

Following a lackluster 2020–21 season, in the following 2021–22 season, the club was crowned league champions for a record seventh time, under manager Sergej Jakirović.

Rivals

Velež

Zrinjski Mostar's main rival is Velež Mostar, the other main football team in Mostar. The highly contested game between both teams is called the Mostar derby. Zrinjski first played against Velež Mostar in the 1920s and 1930s, but when Zrinjski was banned (1945–92) for playing in the fascist league, no games between the rival teams were played. During that period, Velež became a successful club in former Yugoslavia, and it was supported by a majority of Mostarian inhabitants. After Zrinjski's league ban was lifted, the team became one of the important symbols of the Croatian entity in Mostar, and it was mainly supported by Croats. The rival team, Velež, is mostly supported by local Bosniaks. The Mostar derby is highly contested, just as the Sarajevo-Željezničar derby. On 1 March 2000, Zrinjski and Velež played a friendly game for the first time in over 55 years. The game took place in Sarajevo, and ended in a 2–2 draw. The first official game between both teams was played in Premier League of BiH at the Bijeli Brijeg Stadium on 13 August 2000, and was won by Zrinjski with 2–0.

The two fan groups which support each team are:

 HŠK Zrinjski supporters: Ultras Mostar
 FK Velež supporters: Red Army Mostar

Both fanbases still represent a division among ethnic lines, as the Ultras are almost exclusively Croats and the Red Army are mostly Bosniaks. The ethnic connection of both fanbases leads to vigorous clashes at the Mostar derby. Furthermore, some extreme groups of the Red Army are left-wing-inspired, while extreme Ultras are right-wing-inspired, which further exacerbates their rivalry.

Others
Other notable rivals of Zrinjski are Sarajevo clubs Sarajevo and Željezničar. These clubs with a famous history, along with Zrinjski, are favorites for the top of the table almost every season. One of the other reasons for this rivalry is that Mostar is the center of Herzegovina, while Sarajevo is the center of Bosnia, and the capital of the entire country. There is a rivalry with Široki Brijeg as well, the other top team from Herzegovina. This rivalry started during the Herzeg-Bosnia league (1994–2000), and continued in the Premier League. The matches between Široki Brijeg and Zrinjski are mostly called the Herzegovina derby.

Supporters

Zrinjski's main supporter group are called Ultras Mostar. Officially, the Ultras-Zrinjski Fan Club was founded in March 1998, when the Citizens' Associations Act entered into the Registry of Citizens' Associations in the Herzegovina-Neretva Canton, and exists as an unregistered support group since 1994. They promote all sections of the sports club Zrinjski, but they mostly follow its football department. They got their name in 1998, 6 years after Zrinjski's work was restored. They took the name of the fan-based Ultras Movement in European football. The official song of Ultras, fans of HŠK Zrinjski Mostar, is "Gori brate", and they support their club from the grandstand - Stajanje. Colours used by Ultras on transparencies and boards are black, white and red.

Stadium

Zrinjski plays its games on Stadion pod Bijelim Brijegom. The stadium was built in 1971 and was used by city rivals Velež until 1991. The stadium capacity today is 9,000 seats (former 25,000 standings), but in the 1970s and 1980s some games attracted over 35,000 spectators. It was the second largest stadium in Bosnia and Herzegovina (before plastic seats were added) after Asim Ferhatović Hase Stadium in Sarajevo.

Honours

Domestic

League
Premier League of Bosnia and Herzegovina:
 Winners (7): 2004–05, 2008–09, 2013–14, 2015–16, 2016–17, 2017–18, 2021–22  (record)
Runners-up (2): 2006–07, 2018–19
First League of Herzeg-Bosnia:
Runners-up (2): 1993–94, 1997–98

Cups
Bosnia and Herzegovina Cup:
 Winners (1): 2007–08

Players

Current squad

Players with multiple nationalities

  Hrvoje Barišić
  Mario Ćuže
  Silvio Ilinković
  Antonio Ivančić
  Slobodan Jakovljević
  Marin Magdić
  Matija Malekinušić
  Nikola Mandić
  Marko Marić
  Luka Pršlja
  Kristijan Stanić
  Marin Topić

Out on loan

Personnel

Coaching staff

Other information

Managerial history

European record

Legend: GF = Goals For. GA = Goals Against. GD = Goal Difference.

List of matches

1 UEFA expelled Partizan from the 2007–08 UEFA Cup due to crowd trouble at their away tie in Mostar, which forced the match to be interrupted for 10 minutes. UEFA adjudged travelling Partizan fans to have been the culprits of the trouble, but Partizan were allowed to play the return leg while the appeal was being processed. However, Partizan's appeal was rejected so Zrinjski Mostar qualified.

Club ranking

UEFA coefficient

2022–23 season

Source: UEFA.com

Seasons

Key
 League: P = Matches played; W = Matches won; D = Matches drawn; L = Matches lost; F = Goals for; A = Goals against; Pts = Points won; Pos = Final position;
 Cup / Europe: PR = Preliminary round; QR = Qualifying round; R1 = First round; R2 = Second round; Group = Group stage; QF = Quarter-final; SF = Semi-final; RU = Runner-up; W = Competition won;

Notes

References

External links

 
Zrinjski sports association website 
Ultras official website 
HŠK Zrinjski Mostar at UEFA.com 

 
Sport in Mostar
Croatian football clubs in Bosnia and Herzegovina
Football clubs in Bosnia and Herzegovina
Association football clubs established in 1905
1905 establishments in Bosnia and Herzegovina